NRG Networks is a UK-based business networking organisation, founded in June 2004 by Kim Sharman and Martin Davies to facilitate the development of business relationships based on trust and knowledge between SME Business Owners in a social network environment. Dave Clarke  joined as Chief Executive at the end of 2004 and identified that these business relationships resulted in a network of advocates. Networking for Advocates was subsequently introduced as the NRG networking model. Kim Sharman retired at the end of 2006.

The model of "Networking for Advocates" was investigated in some research conducted by Martin Davies and Roger Croft of the University of Bath. The purpose of the research was to further understand the importance of developing trust in business relationships. The research identified certain networking transactions as the currency of developing trusted business relationships. This led to the development of the NRG Networking System based on this Advocacy Model.

NRG Business Networking Advocate Model:

The organisation is structured around local groups, and primarily delivers its benefits via a monthly lunch meeting, preceded by a business development seminar.

NRG basics

Founders: Kim Sharman and Martin Davies
Chief Executive: Dave Clarke
Established: 2004
Philosophy: Advocate marketing

References

Knowledge West > Services > Innovation Networks, businesses and universities working together
NRG to advise on business growth, Financial Times Article May 27, 2006

External links
NRG website

Professional networks
Business organisations based in the United Kingdom